Minuscule 758 (in the Gregory-Aland numbering), ε474 (von Soden), is a Greek minuscule manuscript of the New Testament written on parchment. Palaeographically it has been assigned to the 14th century. The manuscript has complex contents. Scrivener labelled it as 847e.

Description 
The codex contains the text of the four Gospels, on 301 parchment leaves (size ). The text is written in one column per page, 20 lines per page.

It contains tables of the  before each Gospel, lectionary markings at the margin, incipits,  (lessons), subscriptions at the end, and pictures.

Text 
The Greek text of the codex is a representative of the Byzantine text-type. Hermann von Soden classified it to the textual family Kr. Aland placed it in Category V.

According to the Claremont Profile Method, it represents the textual family Kr in Luke 1 and Luke 20. In Luke 10 no profile was made. It creates a textual subgroup with 35.

The text of the Pericope Adulterae is marked by an obelus.

History 
Scrivener dated the manuscript to the 14th century; Gregory dated the manuscript to the 14th or 15th century. The manuscript is currently dated by the INTF to the 14th century.

In 1870 it was presented to Nicholas form Athens.

It was added to the list of New Testament manuscripts by Scrivener (847) and Gregory (758). Gregory saw the manuscript in 1886.

The manuscript is now housed at the National Library of Greece (151) in Athens.

See also 

 List of New Testament minuscules
 Biblical manuscript
 Textual criticism
 Minuscule 757

References

Further reading 

 

Greek New Testament minuscules
14th-century biblical manuscripts
Manuscripts of the National Library of Greece